Dan Cunningham (1 January 1917 – September 2001) was a British actor who made few screen appearances but was a noted stage actor, performing at Eichstätt. He appeared in Laurence Olivier's Richard III (1955) as Lord Grey.

He was married to the actress Rosalie Crutchley in 1939, but the marriage ended in divorce.

Filmography

References

External links

New York Times Profile
MSN Movies Profile

1917 births
2001 deaths
British male film actors
British male stage actors